The acronym MESO may stand for:
 Multiple Equivalent Simultaneous Offers
 Magneto-Electric Spin-Orbit